Factor I may refer to:
 Complement factor I, a protein of the complement system.
 Fibrinogen, a protein involved in blood coagulation.